Whitney Cua Her (born 1992), better known by her stage name Ahney Her, is an American actress.  She is of Hmong descent.

Early life and education
Ahney Her was born and raised in Lansing, Michigan, where she had completed high school at Sexton High School when cast for Gran Torino. She had studied drama in a local talent school for three years.

Career
Her first film role was in the 2008 film Gran Torino, directed by Clint Eastwood. In Gran Torino, Eastwood plays a Korean War veteran who helps a Hmong American family in his Detroit neighborhood. She plays Sue Lor, the intelligent, witty older sister of Thao Vang Lor, who was portrayed by Bee Vang. She was 16 years old at the time of the film's opening in wide release on January 9, 2009.

She was cast in the film after responding to an open casting call sign-up at a soccer tournament. The open call was specifically looking for potential Hmong actors. In a 2009 interview with The Grand Rapids Press, she recalled, "I didn't believe it, 'cause the tent said, you know, 'Clint Eastwood movie' or something like that, 'Hmong people needed.' And I'm like, 'OK, yeah right. Like this would happen.' Out of all people, Hmong people? No."

Ahney Her was in Grand Rapids, Michigan, to watch the first screening of Gran Torino. The film made its Grand Rapids debut at the Theater One at Celebration! Cinemas North on January 9, 2009.

In 2011, she was cast in the action comedy movie Night Club as Nikki, alongside Zachary Abel, Natasha Lyonne, Ernest Borgnine, and Mickey Rooney.

Filmography 
 Gran Torino (2008) - Sue Vang Lor
 Night Club (2011) - Nikki
 Batman v Superman: Dawn of Justice (2016) - Hostage Girl #1

References

External links 

American people of Hmong descent
American film actresses
Actresses from Lansing, Michigan
J. W. Sexton High School alumni
Living people
1992 births
American child actresses
Date of birth missing (living people)
21st-century American women
American actresses of Asian descent